Fowlers Mill is an unincorporated community in Geauga County, in the U.S. state of Ohio.

History
The namesake Fowler's Mills was a gristmill built in 1831 by Hiram and Milo Fowler. A post office operated at Fowlers Mill from 1834 until 1906.

References

Unincorporated communities in Geauga County, Ohio
Unincorporated communities in Ohio